Amrabad (also Romanized as ‘Amrābād) is a village in Korbal Rural District, in the Central District of Kharameh County, Fars Province, Iran. At the 2006 census, its population was 29, in 4 families.

References 

Populated places in Kharameh County